The Icehouse Historic District is a  historic district in Selma, Dallas County, Alabama.  It is bounded by J.L. Chestnut, Jr. Boulevard (formerly Jeff Davis Avenue) on the north, the banks of Valley Creek on the west, Dallas Avenue on the south, and Union and Lapsley streets on the east.  The district includes examples of the Tudor Revival, American Craftsman, Colonial Revival, and other early 20th century residential styles.  It contains 213 contributing buildings and 141 noncontributing structures.  The district is a neighborhood of small wood-frame and brick residences housing a mixture of low and middle-income families along tree-lined streets.  It was added to the National Register of Historic Places on June 28, 1990.

References

National Register of Historic Places in Dallas County, Alabama
Historic districts in Dallas County, Alabama
Historic districts on the National Register of Historic Places in Alabama